Brock Mountain is a mountain located in the Catskill Mountains of New York southeast of Downsville, New York. Sugarloaf Mountain is located northwest of Brock Mountain and Mary Smith Hill is located east.

References

Mountains of Delaware County, New York
Mountains of New York (state)